SPDR may refer to:

 SPDR funds, exchange-traded funds
 Standard & Poor's Depositary Receipts, an exchange-traded fund
 System Peril Distributed Reflex, in the game I Love Bees

See also
 Spyder (disambiguation)
 Spider (disambiguation)
 Speeder (disambiguation)